Net-Centric Enterprise Services (NCES) is a Department of Defense  program, managed by the Defense Information Systems Agency, to develop information technology infrastructure services for future systems used by the United States military.

Technically, the program is based on the concept of 'enterprise integration' from the sub discipline enterprise engineering of systems engineering, which enables the transmission of right information at the right place and at the right time and thereby enable communication between people, machines and computers and their efficient co-operation and co-ordination.

There are nine core enterprise services defined in the Network Centric Operations and Warfare - Reference Model (NCOW-RM):
 storage
 mediation
 user assist
 IA (Information Assurance)
 ESM (Enterprise Service Management)
 messaging
 discovery & delivery
 application
 collaboration

NCES maps these nine services to four product areas:
 Enterprise service-oriented architecture (SOA) foundation
 Content discovery and delivery
 Enterprise collaboration
 Defense on-line portal

See also
 Defense Discovery Metadata Specification
 Service-oriented architecture
 Web Service
 Enterprise integration 
 Enterprise engineering

External links
NCES Web Site
NCES User's Guide

United States Department of Defense
Service-oriented (business computing)
Net-centric